Kudumbam is a 1984 Indian Tamil-language drama film, directed by S. A. Chandrasekhar. The film stars Vijayakanth, Devisri, Jaishankar and Sujatha. It was released on 22 November 1984.

Plot 
Vijay falls in love with Devi. With the empowerment of Shankar and her sister Vijaya, the marriage is granted. While Vijay can not find time with Devi for entertainment. She gives birth to a baby but Devi is suddenly dead.

An argument takes place in the family and he decides to divide his entourage by sharing the house. Vijay gets his daughter, raised by his sister but runs away with Raja, son of Vijaya. Both children are in the street but are and recovered, protected by Latha. Gangs are trying to capture his children, but Vijay and Latha are helping them. The film ends when the family also gets closer to them.

Cast

Soundtrack 
Soundtrack was composed by Gangai Amaran.

References

External links 
 

1980s Tamil-language films
1984 films
Films directed by S. A. Chandrasekhar
Films scored by Gangai Amaran